Aljaž Lodge in the Vrata Valley (1015 m a.s.l.) is a mountain hut that lies near the stream Triglav Bistrica in the upper end of the Vrata Valley. The hut is named after the Slovene priest and composer Jakob Aljaž (1845–1927), who in 1896 ordered the construction of the first wooden hut in the valley. The original Aljaž Lodge was built in 1904, and rebuilt in 1910 after the previous one was destroyed by an avalanche. Aljaž Lodge is the starting point to ascend the mountains Triglav, Škrlatica and Cmir.

Starting point 
 12 km (2½h) from Mojstrana (Kranjska Gora)

Neighbouring lodges 
 2½h: to Bivouac IV Lodge at the Rušje Plateau (1980 m)
 4½h: to Valentin Stanič Lodge (2332 m), at Tominšek Route
 5h: to Valentin Stanič Lodge (2332 m), at the Prag Route
 4h: to Pogačnik Lodge at the Križ Plateau (2050 m) through the Sovatna Valley
 5h: to the Triglav Lodge at Kredarica (2515 m), at Tominšek Route
 5½h: to the Triglav Lodge at Kredarica (2515 m), at the Prag Route
 6h: to the Dolič Lodge (2151 m) via Luknja Saddle

Neighbouring mountains 
 5h: Bovec Mount Gamsovec (2392 m), over Luknja Saddle (1758 m)
 4-5h: Cmir (2393 m), through the Valley Behind Cmir
 4-5h: Dolek Spike (2591 m), passing Bivouac IV Lodge on the Rušje Plateau
 4½h: Stenar (2501 m), over the Dovje Pass (2180 m)
 5-6h: Škrlatica (2740 m), passing Bivouac IV Lodge on the Rušje Plateau
 6-7h: Triglav (2864 m), Bamberg Route, via the Plemenice Ridge

See also 
 Slovenian Mountain Hiking Trail
 Triglav National Park

References 
 Slovenska planinska pot, Planinski vodnik, PZS, 2012, Milenko Arnejšek - Prle, Andraž Poljanec

External links 

 Photos, Routes & Descriptions
 Aljaž Lodge in the Vrata Valley. Mountaineering Association of Slovenia.  

Mountain huts in Slovenia
Julian Alps